Nużewo  is a village in the administrative district of Gmina Ciechanów, within Ciechanów County, Masovian Voivodeship, in east-central Poland.

It is the birthplace of Polish weightlifter and Olympic champion Ireneusz Paliński (1932–2006).

References

Villages in Ciechanów County